Taras Valeriyovych Dmytruk (born 9 March 2000) is a professional Ukrainian football defender who plays for FC Mynai.

Career
Born in Volyn Oblast, Dmytruk is a product of local BRW-VIK from Volodymyr-Volynskyi (first trainer Vasyl Hryhorovych) and Dynamo Kyiv youth sportive school systems.

In February 2020 he was signed by Vorskla Poltava. He made his debut as a second half-time substituted player for Vorskla Poltava in the Ukrainian Premier League in an away drawing match against FC Lviv on 3 July 2020.

References

External links
 

2000 births
Living people
People from Novovolynsk
Ukrainian footballers
FC Vorskla Poltava players
FC Hirnyk-Sport Horishni Plavni players
FC Mynai players
Ukrainian Premier League players
Ukrainian First League players
Ukraine youth international footballers
Association football defenders
Sportspeople from Volyn Oblast